Alexis Prince (born February 5, 1994) was an American professional basketball player with the Chicago Sky of the WNBA.

Prince was a four-year starter at Edgewater High School in Orlando, Florida, where she won numerous awards including Miss Florida Basketball.  She played college basketball at Baylor University. As a high school player at Edgewater High School, Prince was named McDonald's and Parade All-American.

Baylor statistics

Source

References

External links
 

1994 births
Living people
American women's basketball players
Atlanta Dream players
Basketball players from Jacksonville, Florida
Baylor Bears women's basketball players
Chicago Sky players
McDonald's High School All-Americans
Parade High School All-Americans (girls' basketball)
Phoenix Mercury draft picks
Phoenix Mercury players
Shooting guards
21st-century American women